Condylago is a genus of tropical orchid in the Pleurothallidinae subtribe. The name refers to the articulation of the lip which, like the genus Acostaea, is sensitive and snaps up when triggered. The type species is Condylago rodrigoi, described by Carlyle A. Luer in 1982. The leaves are up to about 4" long. Each inflorescence has many flowers and each flower may last for several months. Orchids in this genus have no pseudobulbs.

Condylago rodrigoi is found only in Colombia at altitudes ranging from 4,600 feet (1,400 m) to 5,250 feet (1,600 m). It was named in honor of Sr. Rodrigo Escobar of Medellin, Colombia, who had successfully cultivated this species since its discovery.

In 2007, a second species, Condylago furculifera, was described from Panama. The differences from Condylago rodrigoi include sepals which are more sparsely developed and less white more villous (shaggy), the absence of decurrent basal lobes on the obovate-pan-durate petals, and a viscid lip-callus that is ovate rather than orbicular.

References

External links 
 
 

Pleurothallidinae
Epidendreae genera
Endemic orchids of Colombia
Endemic orchids of Panama